Drafi Franz Richard Deutscher (9 May 1946 – 9 June 2006) was a German singer and songwriter of Sinti origin.

Biography

Early life and career 
Deutscher was born in Charlottenburg, in the western zone of Berlin, Germany. Between 1964 and 1966, Deutscher had a string of hits in Germany, for example "Shake Hands" (1964 No. 1), "Keep Smiling" (1964 No. 7), "Cinderella Baby" (1965 No. 3), "Heute male ich dein Bild, Cindy-Lou" (1965 No. 1).

1965–1967: Marmor, Stein und Eisen bricht and career peak 
His best known song is the 1965 Schlager "Marmor, Stein und Eisen bricht" (lit. "Marble, Stone and Iron Break"), which sold over one million copies, and was awarded a golden record. Nineteen-year-old Deutscher had ad-libbed the tune during an October 1965 audition at Musikverlag Edition Intro Gebrüder Meisel GmbH by humming the melody and only singing the characteristic chorus line of "Dum-Dum, Dum-dum"; asked by present songwriter Christian Bruhn what he intended to do with it to turn it into a complete song, he replied, "Det machst du! ("You do that!"), so songwriter Günter Loose subsequently wrote the German lyrics to the melody.

In the US, the song was released in 1966 under the title "Marble Breaks and Iron Bends" with English lyrics sung by Deutscher. This English version entered the Billboard Hot 100 in May 1966, peaking at No. 80, and sparking a number of English cover versions by contemporary acts such as The Deejays (under the title "Dum Dum (Marble Breaks and Iron Bends)"), as well as by the two Australian acts Peter Fenton and Toni & Royce (aka Toni McCann and Royce Nicholas), none of which seem to have charted. The song later featured in the 2006 film Beerfest, during the Oktoberfest scene.

1967 to early 1980s: Trial, obscurity, and working under pseudonyms 
After his 1965 hit "Marmor, Stein und Eisen bricht", his career in Germany was in full swing, when it was shaken by a 1967 conviction for public indecency (Erregung öffentlichen Ärgernisses) after he had urinated from a balcony while drunk, in plain view of a group of schoolchildren watching him from street level. After his 1967 conviction for public indecency, he virtually disappeared from the public eye as a singer for more than a decade, writing and producing several worldwide hits for Tina Rainford, Boney M, Nino de Angelo and Tony Christie throughout the 1970s under a number of pen names. His few appearances included the song "United (Te Deum)" from 1971 in the show Disco on German television, and the duet "Alaska" with long time friend Tina Rainford in 1972, a song he wrote under the pseudonym 'Renate Vaplus' but produced under his real name. He also wrote and produced Rainford's hits "Silver Bird" and "Fly Away Pretty Flamingo" from 1976. In 1977, he performed as 'Mr. Walkie-Talkie' the song "Be My Boogie Woogie Baby", which was a hit in the Netherlands and Flanders, and peaked at number 62 in Australia. The accompanying album however did not have any impact. As 'Jack Goldbird' he performed as a country singer, often accompanying Tina Rainford as an anonymous supporting act.

It took until the early 1980s for him to make media appearances as a singer again. In 1982, a biopic loosely inspired by Deutscher's life was released to German theaters under the title of his greatest hit, Marmor, Stein und Eisen bricht, in which he appeared in a small cameo role.

Mid-1980s and beyond: Comeback 

Deutscher worked with Christopher Evans Ironside, collaborating with him on a project named Masquerade, and on their co-written 1984 hit, "Guardian Angel", which was popular in many countries.

In late 1986, he achieved success with his duo, Mixed Emotions, together with Oliver Simon, and their single "You Want Love (Maria, Maria...)", a collaboration which sparked three more follow-up hit singles in a row by 1987, a TV theme hit in 1988 ("Running Wild", used for an episode of the crime series Eurocops), and by its success finally inspired him to release his first new album under his real name in two decades, 1989's Über Grenzen geh'n (lit. "Crossing frontiers"). Deutscher's "Das 11. Gebot" got some airplay in 1989 on German radio.

Declining health and death 
In November 1998, Deutscher suffered two strokes, followed by a breakdown in 1999 due to increasing diabetes. He nevertheless continued touring, celebrating his 40-year stage anniversary in 2003. Deutscher died from heart failure in 2006 in Frankfurt, at the age of 60.

Album discography
Shake Hands! Keep Smiling!, 1964
Drafi!, 1966
Weil ich Dich liebe, 1971
Die Welt von heut (Group "Wir"), 1972
Gute Tage & schlechte Tage, 1973
Happy Rummel Music (as "Mr. Walkie Talkie"), 1977
Lost in New York City, 1981
Drafi, 1982 (extended re-release of 1966 album)
The Sound of Masquerade (as "Masquerade"), 1984 - AUS #91
Krieg der Herzen, 1985
Gemischte Gefühle, 1986
Deep From the Heart (Mixed Emotions), 1987
Diesmal für immer, 1987
Just For You (Mixed Emotions), 1988
Steinzart – Die besten Jahre, 1988
Lost in New York City (remix), 1989
Über Grenzen geh'n, 1989
Side by Side (with Andreas Martin as New Mixed Emotions), 1991
Wie Ebbe und Flut, 1992
So viele Fragen, 1996
Zukunft, 1998
We Belong Together (Mixed Emotions), 1999
Wer war Schuld daran, 2002
Diesseits von Eden – Die große Drafi Deutscher Hit-Collection, 2006
The Last Mile, 2007
Drafi (Re-release of the 1982 album with six bonus tracks), 2008

References

External links

Official fan page

1946 births
2006 deaths
Musicians from Berlin
English-language singers from Germany
German composers
20th-century German male singers
German Sinti people
German songwriters
Schlager musicians
Warner Music Sweden artists
People from Charlottenburg-Wilmersdorf
Romani singers